Lycastus is the name of some figures in Greek mythology.

Lycastus or Lykastos may also refer to:
Lycastus (Crete), a town of ancient Crete, Greece
Lycastus (Pontus), a town of ancient Pontus, now in Turkey
Lycastus (river), a river of ancient Pontus, now in Turkey